The Bradleys Head Light is an active heritage-listed lighthouse at Bradleys Head, a headland protruding from the north shore of Sydney Harbour, within Mosman, Mosman Council, Sydney, New South Wales, Australia. It is the sibling of Robertson Point Light. The site is owned and managed as part of the Sydney Harbour National Park by the NSW National Parks and Wildlife Service, an agency of the Government of New South Wales; while the light is managed and operated by Sydney Ports Corporation. It was added to the New South Wales State Heritage Register on 18 April 2000.

History 
The light was introduced in 1905 as a navigation marker and warning light to ships entering and leaving the harbour. A fog siren was added in 1906 and modified in 1936. The concrete structure was introduced in 1949.

The tower was listed on the New South Wales State Heritage Register on 18 April 2000.

Description 
The tower is constructed of timber and concrete. The lighthouse design is similar to the 1934 design at Robertson's Point. Its light characteristic is occulting green light with a cycle of three seconds (Oc.G. 3s), the same as Robertson Point Light. It is mounted on a rock and connected to the shore by a footbridge.

Visiting 
The site is open and accessible to the public, but the tower itself is closed. Parking is available at the end of Bradleys Head Road. Close to the lighthouse is the foremast of the cruiser , a monument for Australian sailors killed at war.

Gallery

See also 

 List of lighthouses in Australia

References

Bibliography

Attribution

External links 

 
 

Lighthouses completed in 1905
Lighthouses in Sydney
1905 establishments in Australia
New South Wales State Heritage Register
Sydney Harbour
Articles incorporating text from the New South Wales State Heritage Register
Mosman, New South Wales